HMS Universal (P57) was a Royal Navy U-class submarine built by Vickers-Armstrong at Newcastle upon Tyne.  So far she has been the only ship of the Royal Navy to bear the name Universal.

Construction
Universal was laid down at Vickers Armstrong, Newcastle upon Tyne in September 1941, launched in November 1942 and commissioned in March 1943.

Career
She spent most of the war in the Mediterranean, where she sank the Italian auxiliary patrol vessels V 130/Ugo and V 134/Tre Sorelle, the Italian merchant La Foce, the German auxiliary gunboat SG 15 (the former French Rageot de la Touche), the German merchants President Dal Piaz and Canosa (the former French Corsa), the German Guardboat FMa 06 (the former French Guarani) and the German auxiliary minesweeper Petrel.  Universal also damaged the Spanish sailing vessel Sevellina and the Italian tanker (in German control) Cesteriano, which was later towed to Toulon.  Universal also fired a torpedo against what is identified as an enemy auxiliary minesweeper. They claimed to have damaged the so far unidentified ship.

Fate
Universal survived the war and was sold to be broken up for scrap in February 1946. On 3 February, on passage from Foyle, Northern Ireland, to Newport, Monmouthshire, under the command of Lieut-Commander W.F.N. Main R.N.R. her engines failed and the following morning she was taken in tow by the destroyer . With the weather deteriorating the tow broke eight or nine times and was eventually abandoned. Lifeboats from Aberystwyth, New Quay and Fishguard attended over 24 hours, standing by in heavy seas until Universals crew had to abandon ship.

She was scrapped at Milford Haven in June 1946.

References

Bibliography

External links
 
 

 

British U-class submarines
Ships built on the River Tyne
1942 ships
World War II submarines of the United Kingdom
Ships built by Vickers Armstrong